cPanel is web hosting control panel software developed by cPanel, LLC. It provides a graphical interface (GUI) and automation tools designed to simplify the process of hosting a web site to the website owner or the "end user". It enables administration through a standard web browser using a three-tier structure. While cPanel is limited to managing a single hosting account, cPanel & WHM allows the administration of the entire server.

In addition to the GUI, cPanel also has command line and API-based access that allows third-party software vendors, web hosting organizations, and developers to automate standard system administration processes. cPanel & WHM is designed to function either as a dedicated server or virtual private server.  The latest cPanel & WHM version supports installation on CentOS, Red Hat Enterprise Linux (RHEL), CloudLinux OS, and Ubuntu. cPanel 11.30 is the last major version to support FreeBSD.

History 

cPanel is currently developed by cPanel, L.L.C., a privately owned corporation headquartered in Houston, Texas, United States. It was originally designed in 1996 as the control panel for Speed Hosting, a now-defunct web hosting company. The original author of cPanel, John Nick Koston, had a stake in Speed Hosting. Webking quickly began using cPanel after their merger with Speed Hosting. The new company moved their servers to Virtual Development Inc. (VDI), a now-defunct hosting facility. Following an agreement between Koston and VDI, cPanel was only available to customers hosted directly at VDI. At the time there was little competition in the control panel market, with the main choices being VDI and Alabanza.

Eventually, due to Koston leaving for college, he and William Jensen signed an agreement in which cPanel was split into a separate program called WebPanel; this version was run by VDI. Without the lead programmer, VDI was not able to continue any work on cPanel and eventually stopped supporting it completely. Koston kept working on cPanel while also working at BurstNET. Eventually, he left BurstNET to focus fully on cPanel.

cPanel 3 was released in 1999: main additions over cPanel 2 were an automatic upgrade and the Web Host Manager (WHM). The interface was also improved when Carlos Rego of WizardsHosting made what became the default theme of cPanel.

On August 20, 2018 cPanel L.L.C. announced that it had signed an agreement to be acquired by a group led by Oakley Capital (who also own Plesk and SolusVM). While Koston sold his interest in cPanel, he will continue to be an owner of the company that owns cPanel.

Add-ons
cPanel provides front-ends for a number of common operations, including the management of PGP keys, crontab tasks, mail and FTP accounts, and mailing lists. Several add-ons exist, some for an additional fee, including auto installers such as Installatron, Fantastico, Softaculous, and WHMSonic (SHOUTcast/radio Control Panel Add-on). The add-ons need to be enabled by the server administrator in WHM to be accessible to the cPanel user.

WHM manages some software packages separately from the underlying operating system, applying upgrades to Apache, PHP, MySQL, Exim, FTP, and related software packages automatically. This ensures that these packages are kept up-to-date and compatible with WHM, but makes it more difficult to install newer versions of these packages. It also makes it difficult to verify that the packages have not been tampered with, since the operating system's package management verification system cannot be used to do so.

WHM 
WHM, short for WebHost Manager, is a web-based tool which is used for server administration. There are at least two tiers of WHM, often referred to as "root WHM", and non-root WHM (or Reseller WHM).  Root WHM is used by server administrators and non-root WHM (with fewer privileges) is used by others, like entity departments, and resellers to manage hosting accounts often referred to as cPanel accounts on a web server. WHM is also used to manage SSL certificates (both server self generated and CA provided SSL certificates), cPanel users, hosting packages, DNS zones, themes, and authentication methods.  The default automatic SSL (AutoSSL) provided by cPanel is powered by Sectigo (formerly Comodo CA). Additionally, WHM can also be used to manage FTP, Mail (POP, IMAP, and SMTP) and SSH services on the server.

As well as being accessible by the root administrator, WHM is also accessible to users with reseller privileges. Reseller users of cPanel have a smaller set of features than the root user, generally limited by the server administrator, to features which they determine will affect their customers' accounts rather than the server as a whole.
From root WHM, the server administrator can perform maintenance operations such as upgrading and recompiling Apache and PHP, installing Perl modules, and upgrading RPMs installed on the system.

Enkompass 
A version of cPanel & WHM for Microsoft Windows, called Enkompass, was declared end-of-life as of February 2014. Version 3 remained available for download, but without further development or support. In the preceding years, Enkompass had been available for free as product development slowed.

Pricing 
On June 27, 2019 cPanel announced a new account-based pricing structure. After backlash from their customers, cPanel issued a second announcement but did not change the new structure.

See also 
 Comparison of web hosting control panels

References

External links 
 

Web applications
Website management
Web server management software
Perl software
1996 software